Discarded Lovers is a 1932 American Pre-Code mystery film directed by Fred C. Newmeyer.

Plot summary
Discarded Lovers is a murder mystery.   Early in the film a blonde bombshell movie star is murdered and her body is found in a car.  She had just finished doing the last and final scenes in a film. Irma Gladden was a sexy blonde bombshell who was having many tangled romantic affairs.  She was loose and easy. In solving the murder there are the usual friends, police, reporters and employees who administer their help to the police captain  and the police sergeant.   In this whodunit suspects abound and include Irma's husband, a jealous wife, a boy friend and an ex-husband.

Cast
Natalie Moorhead as Irma Gladden
Russell Hopton as Bob Adair
J. Farrell MacDonald as Chief Sommers
Barbara Weeks as Valerie Christine
Jason Robards Sr. as Rex Forsythe
Roy D'Arcy as Andre Leighton
Sharon Lynn as Mrs. Sibley
Fred Kelsey as Sgt. Delaney
Robert Frazer as Warren Sibley
Jack Trent as Ralph Norman, the chauffeur

External links

1932 films
American mystery films
American black-and-white films
1932 mystery films
1930s English-language films
Films directed by Fred C. Newmeyer
1930s American films